The Rootare-Prenzlow Equation is named for Estonian-American scientist Hillar Rootare and American scientist Carl , first published in their 1967 paper, "Surface Areas from Mercury Porosimetry Measurements," Rootare, H.M., and Prenzlow, C.F., 71 J. Phys. Chem. p. 2733 (1967). The equation first formulated a means to calculate cumulative surface areas of porous solids based on data taken in mercury porosimetry testing. Rootare and Spencer later devised a computer program to carry out automated calculations, "A Computer Program for Pore Volume and Pore Area Distribution," Rootare & Spencer, Perspectives in Powder Metallurgy (Advanced Experimental Techniques in Powder Metallurgy) p. 225, Plenum Press (New York, London 1970).

Equation
The equation can be found at section 2.2.3 here: http://ethesis.helsinki.fi/julkaisut/mat/farma/vk/westermarck/ch2.html

References

Equations